Binyumen Schaechter (born 1963) is a conductor, music director, composer, arranger, solo performer, and piano accompanist in the world of Yiddish music. He also lectures on topics related to Yiddish music, language, and culture. Many of his songs, choral arrangements, and performances are recorded on video (see YouTube), DVD, and CD. He is a composer (known as Ben Schaechter) in the world of American musical theater and cabaret, and his songs are performed in venues worldwide. He has been music director of The Yiddish Philharmonic Chorus since 1995.

Early Years 

The youngest of four children, Schaechter was born in the East New York section of Brooklyn, NY. His father, Mordkhe Schaechter, was born in Czernowitz, Romania. (The city became part of Ukraine after World War II). His mother, Charlotte (née Saffian), was born in Brooklyn and grew up in the Bronx. Her parents came from the towns of Holoskove and Orynyn, both in Ukraine.

In 1966, the Schaechter family moved to the Norwood Heights section of the Bronx. There, they formed a Yiddish-speaking enclave with several other families that spoke only Yiddish at home. Most of the families lived on Bainbridge Avenue, so the group named itself Di Beynbridzhivke.

Schaechter attended the High School of Music and Art (now LaGuardia High School), Columbia University, and the Manhattan School of Music. Trained as a classical composer and pianist, he studied piano at the Hebrew Arts School for Music and Dance (now the Lucy Moses School) with Natan Brand and composition privately with Dr. Miriam Gideon and John Corigliano. In drama critic Martin Gottfried’s course on American musical theater at Columbia University, Schaechter heard the score to Pippin and was inspired to pursue a career as a theater composer.
 
He was accepted into the acclaimed BMI Musical Theater Workshop, where he formed his first collaborations with librettists and lyricists. His work, with Stephen Schwartz as one of his mentors, was selected for development by ASCAP, the Dramatists’s Guild, and the prestigious Eugene O’Neill National Musical Theater Conference (1992).

Musical Work 

His Off-Broadway music includes songs in Naked Boys Singing! (the fourth-longest-running show in Off-Broadway history, with a subsequent film release), Pets! (Dramatic Publishing), That’s Life! (Outer Critics Circle nominee), Too Jewish? (Drama Desk, Outer Critics Circle nominee) and Double Identity. In its review of Double Identity, The New York Times wrote, “Among [the show's] assets...is the ear-catching score by Ben Schaechter, whose wide-ranging gifts have buoyed recent hit revues like That’s Life! and Too Jewish?”  His revue It Helps to Sing About It: Songs of Ben Schaechter and Dan Kael won the 2018 ASCAP-Bistro Outstanding Revue Award. Their song “I Can Tell Time” won the 2018 MAC Award for Best Song. 

Schaechter has created and performed several Yiddish musical shows, some featuring him as a solo performer and others featuring his actor-singer daughters, Reyna and Temma (known together as Di Shekhter-tekhter). As their music director and piano accompanist, he traveled with the duo to Canada, Brazil, France, Israel, and Australia. A documentary concert video, When Our Bubbas and Zeydas Were Young: The Schaechter Sisters on Stage, was released on DVD in 2012 by Ergo Media. The video, directed by Academy Award-nominated documentary film director Josh Waletzky, was a featured selection in film, theater, and music festivals. More recent videos of Di Shekhter-tekhter are available on YouTube.
 
Currently, Schaechter is music director and conductor of the acclaimed Yiddish Philharmonic Chorus (formerly the Jewish People's Philharmonic Chorus), a 40-voice SATB intergenerational ensemble with an exclusively Yiddish repertoire. They perform contemporary choral arrangements of classics, art songs, folk songs, holiday songs, and other genres, as well as Yiddish translations of popular songs and arias. Schaechter created most of the arrangements and popular song translations in the chorus’s repertoire. The chorus regularly performs in Merkin Hall at Kaufman Music Center and at the annual North American Jewish Choral Festival. They have performed in Symphony Space, Alice Tully Hall, Cathedral of St. John the Divine, West Point Military Academy, and Shea Stadium. The chorus’s live concert recordings are available on YouTube, including the virtual choir video of “Vaserl” they created during the COVID-19 pandemic. This is the first and the only Yiddish virtual choir video in existence.
 
Schaechter is creator and leader of the Yiddish Song Workshop & Sing-along, an ongoing topic-based learning presentation of Yiddish songs over Zoom. More than a thousand people worldwide have registered for these sessions, which are partially funded by The Marinus and Minna B. Koster Foundation.

As Actor, Translator, and Lecturer 

Most of Schaechter’s work focuses on the Yiddish language. As an actor, he was featured in Anna Deveare Smith's one-woman show at Carnegie Hall as the "simultaneous" on-stage Yiddish translator for several of her monologues. He provided the Yiddish translation for the original DVD version of The Life and Times of Hank Greenberg, the first-ever film with an option of Yiddish subtitle translations.

Schaechter has been commissioned to create singable Yiddish translations of operatic arias and American popular songs. His Yiddish versions of “Baby, It’s Cold Outside,” “Auld Lang Syne,” and “Over the Rainbow” are on YouTube.

He’s been invited to give lectures and lead workshops in Israel, Sweden, Canada, and the USA at venues including the Ashkenaz Festival, KlezKamp, KlezKanada, Limmud, Yiddish New York, the Museum of Jewish Heritage, and the North American Jewish Choral Festival.  Popular topics include How to Sing in Yiddish So That It Sounds Like Yiddish, Who Says There Are No Funny Yiddish Songs?, Our Ashkenazic Family Names: What They Mean About Our Families, and – from his own unique perspective – The House on Bainbridge Avenue: Growing Up Speaking Yiddish in Modern Day America.

For many years, Schaechter served as coordinator for Yidish-vokh, an ongoing annual week-long all-Yiddish summer retreat sponsored by Yugntruf Youth for Yiddish – an organization co-founded in 1964 by his father to promote Yiddish as an active, spoken language.

Family 

Schaechter is from a family that figures prominently in the study and continuation of Yiddish language and culture. His father, Dr. Mordkhe Schaechter, was an influential Yiddish linguist who wrote and edited topical dictionaries, textbooks, and many magazine and journal articles – in Yiddish and about Yiddish. His mother, Charlotte (Charne), spent much of her life as a piano accompanist to Yiddish singers. His aunt, Beyle Schaechter-Gottesman, was a Yiddish poet, a songwriter, and a spiritual guide to many of the Klezmer musicians in the world today. His cousin Dr. Itzik Gottesman, former associate editor of the Forverts and the Tsukunft, is a scholar of Yiddish folklore. His sister Rukhl Schaechter, current editor of the Forverts, hosts the publication’s online Yiddish cooking program Est gezunterheyt! and is creator and host of their popular online Yiddish Word of the Day. His sister Gitl Schaechter-Viswanath is a Yiddish poet and co-editor of the Comprehensive English-Yiddish Dictionary. She is board chair of League for Yiddish, where she produces Verter fun der Vokh (Words of the Week), a series providing subscribers with Yiddish translations of timely words and phrases. His niece Meena Viswanath is a developer of the Duolingo Yiddish course. His nephew Arun Schaechter Viswanath created a Yiddish translation of Harry Potter and the Philosopher's Stone (Harry Potter un der filosofisher shteyn). For Schaechter and his sisters, Yiddish has always been the primary language at home. The siblings combined have 16 adult children, most of whom are also raising their own children as native Yiddish speakers.

Works 

Naked Boys Singing
Ball Games (produced in Dallas, Texas)
Dinner at Eight (BMI's Jerry Bock Award)
Double Identity
From Kinehora to Coney Island
Gay 90s Musical (produced in L.A. and elsewhere)
Hangin' Out (sequel to Naked Boys Singing, produced in L.A.) 
Our Zeydas and Bubbas As Children
Out of the Blue
Pets! (Dramatic Publishing)
Pripetshik Sings Yiddish! (DVD, Ergo Media, distributor)
That's Life! (nominee, Outer Critics Circle Award)
The Shtetl Comes to Life
The Wild Swans (ASCAP's Bernice Cohen Award; selected, Eugene O'Neill National Music Theatre Conference)
Too Jewish? (nominee: Drama Desk Award, Outer Critics Circle Awards)
When Our Bubbas and Zeydas Were Young: The Schaechter Sisters on Stage (DVD, Ergo Media, distributor)
Who Says Yiddish Songs Aren't Funny?
Yiddish Top Khay – Singalong Countdown of the 18 Most Sung Yiddish Songs
Provided the translations for the first-ever DVD with Yiddish subtitles, The Life And Times Of Hank Greenberg.

References 

 JPPC  
 Di Shekhter-tekhter  
 Pripetshik Singers 
 Recordings

External links
A Labor of Love to Save Yiddish From Extinction

American male conductors (music)
American people of Romanian-Jewish descent
American people of Ukrainian-Jewish descent
1963 births
Yiddish-speaking people
Living people
21st-century American conductors (music)
21st-century American male musicians
People from East New York, Brooklyn